The 2011–12 Coupe de la Ligue was the 18th edition of the French league cup competition. The defending champions were Marseille, who defeated Montpellier 1–0 in the 2010–11 edition of the final. The competition was organized by the Ligue de Football Professionnel and open to the 42 professional clubs in France that are managed by the organization. The final was contested on 14 April 2012 at the Stade de France. The winner of the competition will qualify for the 2012–13 UEFA Europa League and be inserted into the third qualifying round.

Calendar

First round
The draw for the opening round of the 2011–12 edition of the Coupe de la Ligue was completed on 24 June 2011. The first round featured 24 clubs; the four professional clubs in the Championnat National, the third division of French football, and the 20 clubs in Ligue 2. The matches were played on 22–23 July 2011. Strasbourg's and Grenoble's participation in the competition was previously in limbo. Strasbourg's participation was questionable because of the club's administrative relegation to the Championnat de France amateur, the fourth level of French football, which resulted in the loss of the club's professional status, while Grenoble underwent liquidation. On 12 July, the Ligue de Football Professionnel confirmed that, due to Grenoble's liquidation, the club would not participate in the Coupe de la Ligue. As a result of the announcement, Châteauroux, Grenoble first round combatants, were automatically inserted into the second round. A week later, a similar ruling was made in the case of Strasbourg, who, as a result of its demotion to the fourth division, lost its professional status. Boulougne-sur-Mer, Strasbourg's first round opponent, were shifted to the second round.

Second round
The draw for the second round of the 2011–12 edition of the Coupe de la Ligue was completed on 24 June 2011. The second round featured the 12 winners of the first round matches. The matches were played on 9 August 2011.

Third round
The draw for the third round of the 2011–12 edition of the Coupe de la Ligue was completed on 11 August 2011. The third round featured the six winners of the second round matches, as well as the Ligue 1 clubs who were not playing in European competition this season. The matches were played on 30–31 August and 1 September 2011.

Round of 16 
The draw for the Round of 16 of the 2011–12 edition of the Coupe de la Ligue was completed on 6 September 2011. The round featured the ten winners of the third round matches, as well as the Ligue 1 clubs who were playing in European competition this season. The matches were played on 25–26 October 2011.

Quarter-finals 
The draw for the quarter-finals of the 2011–12 edition of the Coupe de la Ligue was completed on 26 October 2011. The round featured the eight winners of the Round of 16 matches. The matches were played on 10–11 January 2012.

Semi-finals 
The draw for the semi-finals of the 2011–12 edition of the Coupe de la Ligue was completed on 11 January 2012. The round will feature the four winners of the quarter-final matches. The matches were played on 31 January and 1 February 2012.

Final

Statistics

Top goalscorers

1Players in bold are still active in the competition.

Last updated: 26 October 2011
Source: Official Goalscorers' Standings

Notes

See also 
 2011–12 Ligue 1
 2011–12 Ligue 2
 2011–12 Championnat National

References

External links 
 Official site 

Coupe de la Ligue seasons
France
League Cup